Ayşe Hatun (1476–1539) was a daughter of Meñli I Giray and an (alleged) consort of Selim I.

Biography

Ayşe Hatun was married firstly in 1504 to Selim's brother Şehzade Mehmed, Sancak Bey of Kefe, son of Ferahşad Hatun and became widow by his death in 1507.

Her marriage was one of only two examples of marriages between the Ottoman dynasty and the Giray dynasty; the other one was between Selim's daughter to Saadet I Giray.

After her first husband's death, the Crimean princess entered in 1511 the harem of her husband's brother, the future Sultan Selim I (1513–20), when he was the governor of Amasya, thus securing for him, in the person of her powerful father, a valuable ally in the prince's struggle for the throne.

See also
List of consorts of the Ottoman Sultans

References

16th-century consorts of Ottoman sultans
1476 births
1539 deaths
People from Crimea
Crimean Khanate